The 2013–14 Primera División was the 26th edition of Spain's highest women's football league. Barcelona were the defending champions, having won their 2nd straight title in the previous season.

The competition, running from 15 September 2013 to 4 May 2014, was contested by 16 teams, with Granada and Oviedo Moderno as the newly promoted teams. Oviedo Moderno replaced Torrejón, which was disbanded days after attaining promotion.

Teams

Stadia and locations

League table

Results

Season statistics
As of Week 30

Top scorers

Hat-tricks

Best goalkeepers

Fantastic Team

Transfers

See also
 2013–14 Segunda División (women)
 2014 Copa de la Reina de Fútbol

References

External links
Season at soccerway.com

2013-14
Spa
1
women's